Armand Russell (June 23, 1921 – October 1, 2012) was a Canadian politician from Quebec.

Background

He was born on June 23, 1921, in Saint-Joachim-de-Shefford, Quebec.

Town politics

Russell served as City Councillor in 1949 and 1950 and as Mayor from 1950 to 1957 in Saint-Joachim-de-Shefford.  He also served as Mayor of Waterloo, Quebec, from 1957 to 1967.

Member of the legislature

He won a seat to the Legislative Assembly of Quebec in the 1956 election for the Union Nationale in the riding of Shefford.  He was re-elected in the 1960, 1962 and 1966 elections.

Cabinet Member

Russell was appointed to the Cabinet, serving as Minister responsible for Public Works from 1966 to 1967 and Minister of Public Works from 1967 to 1970.  He was re-elected in the 1970 election, but was defeated in 1973 election.

Political comeback

Russell was re-elected in the riding of Brome-Missisquoi in the 1976 election.

Federal politics

He resigned to run as a Progressive Conservative in 1980 election in the riding of Shefford.  He lost against Liberal candidate Jean Lapierre.

Electoral record

References

1921 births
2012 deaths
Mayors of places in Quebec
Union Nationale (Quebec) MNAs
Progressive Conservative Party of Canada candidates for the Canadian House of Commons
Candidates in the 1980 Canadian federal election